Volpara is a comune (municipality) in the Province of Pavia in the Italian region Lombardy, located about 60 km south of Milan and about 30 km southeast of Pavia.

Volpara borders the following municipalities: Alta Val Tidone, Canevino, Golferenzo, Montecalvo Versiggia.

References

Cities and towns in Lombardy